Sahara One is an Indian Hindi general entertainment channel based in New Delhi. It is operated by Sahara India Pariwar.

History
Sahara One was launched as Sahara TV on 28 March 2000, which later in April 2003 was renamed as Sahara Manoranjan. As to compete with other channels and attract more audience, the channel once again changed its name to Sahara One on 10 October 2004.

The channel launched in the United States in 2005 on EchoStar along with the sister channel Filmy. and they launched Firangi, a Hindi entertainment channel in 2008.

Since 2015, Sahara One no longer air new programmes and air reruns of previous shows.

Programming

The channel provides a mix of fiction and non-fiction entertainment shows, events, dramas, mythological series, reality shows, kids programming, thrillers, feature films and film-based programmes. Some of the most successful shows to date include Shubh Mangal Savadhan, Woh Rehne Waali Mehlon Ki, Ek Chutki Aasman, Kituu Sabb Jaantii Hai, Ganesh Leela, Kucchh Pal Saath Tumhara, Hare Kkaanch Ki Choodiyaan, Raat Hone Ko Hai, Hukum Mere Aaka, Aavishkar Ek Rakshak, Chacha Chaudhary, Prratima (based on the Bengali novel, "Protima", written by Tara Shankar Bandopadhyay), Shorr, Suno...Har Dil Kuch Kehta Hai, Sati - Satya ki Shakti and Zaara (TV series).

It has broadcast the cartoon series Just Kids!, one of the most watched kids show of that time, hosted by Yash Pathak. 
 
It also has broadcast television shows with Bollywood celebrities in the main roles such as Sridevi in Malini Iyer, Karisma Kapoor in Karishma - The Miracles of Destiny, Raveena Tandon in Sahib Biwi Gulam and Hema Malini in Kamini Damini.

References

External links
 Sahara One official website
 Sahara One Media and Entertainment Limited
 Sahara One Motion Pictures

Television stations in Mumbai
Television channels and stations established in 2000
Mass media in Uttar Pradesh
Hindi-language television channels in India
Sahara India Pariwar